Mauchsberg is a small village in Thaba Chweu Local Municipality of Mpumalanga province, South Africa.

Populated places in the Thaba Chweu Local Municipality